The East Anglia Transport Museum is an open-air transport museum, with numerous historic public transport vehicles (including many in full working order). It is located in Carlton Colville a suburb of Lowestoft, Suffolk. It is the only museum in the country where visitors can ride on buses, trams and trolleybuses, as well as a narrow-gauge railway.

What the Museum offers
The museum has many exhibits ranging from a 1904 Lowestoft Corporation tram to a 1985 Sinclair C5. Tram rides are available on a route passing the museum's trolleybus depot and up to a terminus at Woodside. Originally, the trolleybus route extended as far as the trolleybus depot where passengers could change for a ride on the museum's 2 ft gauge railway to Chapel Road (the other end of the tram route), or they could stay on the trolleybus whilst it performed a 3-point turn and returned to the museum entrance via the same route.

12 July 2008 marked Britain's first trolleybus extension for many decades through the creation of a loop along the Back Road, linking in with the existing overhead wiring near to the museum's entrance. This follows the tarmacadaming of the Back Road, which previously had been a muddy field, and the renaming of this to Herting Street - in honour of the gentleman whose generous donation made these works possible.

Exhibits include the last trolleybus to operate under its own power in London, No. 1521, one of a batch of 150 L3 class vehicles built on chassis made by Associated Equipment Company (AEC) and Metro Cammell Weymann in 1939–40. When it entered Fulwell Depot in the evening of 8 May 1962, it marked the end of what had been the world's largest trolleybus network.

History
The museum was founded on its present site at Carlton Colville in 1965, following the rescue in 1962 by four enthusiasts of the body of an old Lowestoft tram (number 14), which had been used for a number of years as a summerhouse. The site was formerly a meadow, donated by the founder and first chairman of the Museum Society, Albert Bird. The first buildings on the site were constructed in 1966, but development work on the site took a number of years to complete, and the museum first opened to the public on 28 May 1972. Full tram and trolleybus operations began in 1981, following the construction of a suitable roadway.

The Museum's narrow gauge railway, known as the East Suffolk Light Railway, opened in 1973. Signals were obtained from several locations in the vicinity. The museum also owns a van body which once ran on the Southwold Railway.

In 2016, the museum acquired some land adjacent to the main site, and then applied to Waveney District Council to allow them to extend the museum site. The Council decided that such a move would be beneficial to the region, as the museum injected some £450,000 into the local economy in 2016, and voted to grant planning permission unanimously. The estimated cost for the development is one million pounds, which should see the tramway, the trolleybus route and the narrow gauge railway lengthened, and the total area of the site almost doubling. Plans include the construction of a new exhibition hall devoted to Eastern Coach Works, a major builder of bus and train bodywork, which was located in nearby Lowestoft, until its closure in 1987. The plans provided for two new depots to be built, one for trams and the other for trolleybuses. At the time of the application, some 20 vehicles were kept in store at Ellough near Beccles, and the museum aimed to move all of them to the Carlton Colville site, so that they could be seen by the public more easily.

The first of the transport systems to be extended was the East Suffolk Light Railway, which originally terminated near the woodland tramway. Progress was blocked by a tramway siding, and one of the early jobs was to construct a flat crossing to allow the trains to pass over the tramway.

Exhibits

Trams

Blackpool Corporation VAMBAC enclosed single-decker No. 11 built in 1939. Awaiting repair.
Lowestoft Corporation Tramways open topper No. 14 built in 1904. Undergoing restoration.
Blackpool Corporation Standard Class enclosed double-decker No. 159 built in 1927. Operational.
Amsterdam Tramways enclosed single decker No. 474 built in 1929. Operational.
Glasgow Corporation Tramways enclosed double-decker No. 488 built in 1903. Undergoing restoration at the Ffestiniog Railway.           
Sheffield Corporation enclosed double-decker No. 513 built in 1950. Operational, on loan from Beamish Museum
London Transport enclosed double-decker No. 1858 built in 1930. Operational.

Trolleybuses
 1 Privately owned German Trolleybus
 5 Garrett 1926 Copenhagen
 34 Sunbeam 1947 Hastings Corporation
 52 BUT 9611T 1953 Maidstone Corporation Transport
 87 BUT 9612T 1956 Ashton-Under-Lyne Corporation
 202 Sunbeam 1935 Bournemouth Corporation
 224 Sunbeam 1953 Derby Corporation (away from museum undergoing restoration)
 237 Sunbeam 1960 Derby Corporation (Privately Owned)
 246 Sunbeam 1958 Belfast Corporation
 260 AEC 1936 London Transport
 286 Sunbeam 1959 Bournemouth Corporation
 313 BUT 1951 Portsmouth Corporation
 628 BUT 1950 Newcastle Corporation
 1201 Leyland 1938 London Transport
 1521 Chassisless Construction by Metro-Cammell using AEC components 1940 London Transport

Motorbuses
 21 AEC Regent II 1947 Lowestoft Corporation
 LL408 Bristol 1948 Eastern Counties
 RTL 1050 Leyland Titan  1950 London Transport
 LFL57 Bristol Lodekka 1962 Eastern Counties
 4 AEC Swift 1969 Lowestoft corporation
 85 AEC Reliance 1964 Great Yarmouth
 4 AEC Swift 1969 Lowestoft Corporation
 VR385 Bristol VR 1972 Eastern Counties
 13 Mercedes-Benz 608D 1987 Lincolnshire Road Car
 66 Leyland PD2/1 1949 Great Yarmouth Corporation
 62 Dennis Dart 1995 Great Yarmouth Transport

Locomotives
There are four locomotives which operate on the  gauge East Suffolk Light Railway. All of them have four-wheel chassis, with diesel engines and mechanical transmission. One was made by Ruston and Hornsby of Lincoln and three were made by Motor Rail of Bedford. The frames of a fourth Motor Rail locomotive were used to form the chassis of a brakevan.

See also
List of transport museums
List of trolleybus systems in the United Kingdom
The Trolleybus Museum at Sandtoft
Black Country Living Museum - also with trolleybuses and trams

Gallery

Bibliography

References

External links

Museum website

Bus museums in England
Lowestoft
Museums in Suffolk
Tram museums
Tramways with double-decker trams
Transport museums in England
Trolleybus transport in the United Kingdom